Anaseini Qionibaravi was a Fijian politician. She was the first woman to serve in the Senate.

Biography
Qionibaravi was educated at Adi Cakobau School. She worked as a home economics teacher and radio announcer, also becoming the first chair of the Fiji Consumer Council.

When the Senate was established in 1970, Qionibaravi was appointed for a six-year term as one of Prime Minister Kamisese Mara's nominees. She was the only woman in the Senate. In 1973 her husband Mosese was elected to the House of Representatives. The couple had four children.

In 1978 she resigned as chair of the Consumer Council, claiming it was underfunded.

References

People educated at Adi Cakobau School
Fijian educators
Fijian radio people
Consumer rights activists
Members of the Senate (Fiji)
20th-century Fijian women politicians
20th-century Fijian politicians